Charlie Higgins (12 May 1921 – 30 January 1997) was a Scottish footballer who played as a full back in the Football League for Chester.

References

1921 births
1997 deaths
Footballers from Bellshill
Association football fullbacks
Scottish footballers
Greenock Morton F.C. players
Arbroath F.C. players
Chester City F.C. players
Airdrieonians F.C. (1878) players
Motherwell F.C. players
Albion Rovers F.C. players
East Stirlingshire F.C. players
Scottish Football League players
English Football League players
Scottish schoolteachers